The Hamilton–Lay Store, also known as the Hamilton Crossroads Store, is a historic country general store at Hamilton Crossroads (the intersection of Mill Pond Hollow Road and Walkers Ford Road) in Union County, Tennessee, near Maynardville. The two-story wooden building was built in the 1840s and listed on the National Register of Historic Places in 2011.

References

External links
 Photos of the Hamilton–Lay Store, Knoxville News Sentinel

Buildings and structures in Union County, Tennessee
Commercial buildings on the National Register of Historic Places in Tennessee
National Register of Historic Places in Union County, Tennessee